is a Japanese football player for Nara Club.

Playing career
Yosei Otsu joined to J2 League club; Thespakusatsu Gunma in 2014. In 2016, he moved to J3 League club; Oita Trinita. I

Club statistics
Updated to 18 November 2018.

References

External links

Profile at Oita Trinita

1995 births
Living people
Association football people from Osaka Prefecture
Japanese footballers
J2 League players
J3 League players
Japan Football League players
Thespakusatsu Gunma players
Oita Trinita players
J.League U-22 Selection players
SC Sagamihara players
Nara Club players
Association football forwards